Hariharganj block is one of the administrative blocks of Palamu district, Jharkhand state, India. According to census (2001), the block has 13,579 households with aggregate population of 87,499. The block has 194 villages.

Hariharganj lies on the border of the Palamu district, along the National Highway 139. The people of this region primarily speak Magadhi.

Geography

Hariharganj is situated at the border of Bihar and Jharkhand at NH-98.

Demographics 
 Geographical Area        - 
 Total Population         - 87499
 Total Population (Male)  - 45397
 Total Population (Female)- 42102
 Total Literates          - 34230
 Total Literate (Male)    - 22859
 Total Literate (Female)  - 11371

Administration 
The panchyayats under this block include:

 Saraiya
 Salaiya
 Pipra
 Dalpatpur
 Babhandih
 Semarwar
 Dhakcha
 Arruwa Khurd
 Satgawa or Hariharganj east part
 Siyar Bhucka
 Kataiya
 Kharagpur
 Sarsot
 Tendua
 Madhubana
 Kulahiya
 Belodar
 Dema

Infrastructure 
Primary Health Centres

 Health         - Sanctioned post-25, Working-16, vacancy-9
 Family Welfare - Sanctioned post-23, Working-11, vacancy-12
 Malaria        - Sanctioned post-5, Working-2, vacancy-3

 Health Facilities
The citizens of this C.D.BLOCK avail 2 Allopathy Hospital, 2 Maternity & Child Welfare Center, 2 Registered Private Medical Practitioners

 Drinking Water/Water Supply
 The main sources of water in this C.D.BLOCK are 1 tap water, 126 well water, 3 tank water, 112 handpump, 4 river, 3 canals

 Post and Telegraph
 There are 13 Post Office, 3 telephone connections

 Communication facilities and approach to the village
 This block is linked with 22 Bus services

 Banking facilities
 It has 5 Commercial Bank, 3 Co-operative Commercial Bank. There are 2 Agricultural Credit Societies, 1 Other Credit Societies.

 Power supply
 It has electricity connection and receives the power 19 for Domestic use, 8 for Agricultural use, 2 for Other purposes, 10 for all purposes.

 Recreational facilities
 It has 2 Cinema Hall/Video Halls

 Land use/land cover and Irrigation
 Total Irrigated Area: 3123.69
 Total Unirrigated Area: 8587.12

Education 
No. of schools:
 Primary schools - 58
 Middle schools - 13
 High schools - 3

Some of the notable educational institutes include:
 Sita+2 High School
 Balika Ucch Vidyalaya
 Moti Raj Mahila Maha Vidyalaya
 Bal Kishore Singh Maha Vidyalaya

See also
 Palamu Loksabha constituency
 Jharkhand Legislative Assembly
 Jharkhand
 Palamu

References 

Community development blocks in Jharkhand
Community development blocks in Palamu district